Pentti Olavi Niemi (1902–1962) was a Finnish Lutheran clergyman and politician. He was born on 9 July 1902 in Tampere, and was a member of the Parliament of Finland from 1948 to 1954 and again from 1958 until his death on 7 February 1962, representing the Social Democratic Party of Finland (SDP).

References

1902 births
1962 deaths
Finnish Christian socialists
20th-century Finnish Lutheran clergy
Members of the Parliament of Finland (1948–51)
Members of the Parliament of Finland (1951–54)
Members of the Parliament of Finland (1958–62)
People from Häme Province (Grand Duchy of Finland)
Politicians from Tampere
Social Democratic Party of Finland politicians
University of Helsinki alumni